Genoa is the sixth biggest city in Italy. The oldest skyscrapers are the  Torre Piacentini, which was built in the years 1938–1940, and Dante 2 built in 1939.

Gallery

Tallest buildings 

Tallest under construction - approved and proposed

See also

List of tallest buildings in Italy

References

External links 

 Emporis.com report for Genoa
 Skyscraperpage.com report for Genoa

 
Genoa